Myung Jae Nam or Jae-Nam Myong (1938 – August 3, 1999) was a Korean Hapkido practitioner who founded two martial art styles; Hankido and Hankumdo.

Life
Myung Jae Nam was born in Jeollanam-do province but lived in Incheon for most of his life.

He started his martial arts training in 1948 with his grandfather Myung Jung-min (명중민, 1884–1961) who taught him ssireum and later practiced with a teacher named Bang Gi-hwa (방기화). In 1958 he moved to Seoul where he learned hapkido from Ji Han Jae at the Joong Bu Si Jang location.  Joining Myung at that time were Bong Soo Han and Choi Sea Oh. In 1959 Myung Jae Nam moved back to his hometown where he taught for some time at the local fire station. In February 1964 Myung Jae-nam moved again, this time to Incheon where he started his own school named Jeong Do Gwan (정도관).

In 1972 Myung was one of the original members of the Korea Hapkido Association (Dae Han Hapkido Hyub Hwe), which was formed in 1965 at the request of the South Korean President Park Chung Hee.

In January 1972, he changed the name of his own group to the "Han Kuk Hapki Hwe", and moved his headquarters from Incheon to Bukchang-Dong, Chung-Ku, in Seoul, Korea. In October 1973, while still maintaining his own organization, he assisted in the forming the "Dae Han Min Kuk Hapkido Hyop Hwe" (Republic of Korea Hapkido Association) and was appointed the executive director and he remained with that organization until 1980.

In August 1974, he again changed the name of his own organization to "Kuk Jae Yong Meng Hapki Hwe" and is known in English as the International H.K.D Federation.  In the same year he also co-founded the Korean Hapkido Association.

Accomplishments
Myung Jae Nam exchanged martial art techniques and information with an Aikido practitioner named Hirata in 1965, for a period of about four years. In 1969, Myung broke from the Korea Hapkido Association (Dae Han Hapkido Hyub Hwe) and formed his own group called the "Han Kuk Hapki Sool Hwe". He considered himself associated with the Aikikai in Japan and on his certificates from that era, he even has aikido founder Morihei Ueshiba's name at the top.

Myung was the former Korean representative for the Aikikai and has included many aikido-like techniques into his version of hapkido. He has produced Several books and videos on the subject of hapkido self-defense and hankido.

In the 1980s Myung Jae Nam started working on the development of his own unique martial art, which was later called hankido (한기도). He wanted to develop a martial art for the people of Korea, which would be simple and easy to learn.

Hankido's core consists of only twelve basic techniques.  Myung Jae Nam once said that it is better learn one technique a thousand times instead of practicing a thousand different techniques. 
 
In the years after the first Hapkido Games, he traveled around the world to promote his unique style and his own organization, the International Hapkido Federation.  This organization has its headquarters in Yong-In, Korea, and in 1996 included well over one million members worldwide in fifty countries.

He started the development of another sword art called Hankumdo (한검도) which gives the foreign practitioner a chance to learn the Korean alphabet, hangul.

Personal life
Myung Jae Nam married his wife Yang Sun Bok in 1965. They had three children, two boys and one daughter.

Death
On August 3, 1999, Myung Jae Nam died in Yong-In, Korea from stomach cancer.  His first son Myung Sung Kwang, is now the 2nd doju, of the International H·K·D Federation - Jae Nam Musul Won.

His older twin brother Myung Jae Ok survives him teaching his own martial art which he founded based upon circular motion called Hoi Jeon Moo Sool.

See also
Korean martial arts
List of people of Korean descent

References

External links
International H.K.D. Federation Headquarters

Martial arts school founders
South Korean hapkido practitioners
1938 births
1999 deaths
Deaths from stomach cancer
20th-century philanthropists